Asura calamaria is a moth of the family Erebidae first described by Frederic Moore in 1888. It is found in from the north-eastern Himalayas to Sundaland, including Myanmar. The habitat consists of disturbed forests, including disturbed alluvial forests and remnants of primary montane forests.

The larvae have been recorded defoliating Bougainvillea species.

References

calamaria
Moths described in 1888
Moths of Asia